Ali Al-Khawajah (born 3 February 1957) is a Kuwaiti foil and sabre fencer. He competed at the 1976 and 1980 Summer Olympics.

References

External links
 

1957 births
Living people
Kuwaiti male foil fencers
Olympic fencers of Kuwait
Fencers at the 1976 Summer Olympics
Fencers at the 1980 Summer Olympics
Kuwaiti male sabre fencers